Norman Shaw Thomson (20 February 1901 – 6 June 1984) was a Scottish professional footballer, best remembered for his three-year spell as an inside forward with Dumbarton in the Scottish League. He also played in the Football League, most notably for Luton Town and Walsall.

Career statistics

References

1901 births
Scottish footballers
English Football League players
Brentford F.C. players
Footballers from Greenock
Association football inside forwards
Dumbarton F.C. players
Hibernian F.C. players
Luton Town F.C. players
Leyton Orient F.C. players
Brighton & Hove Albion F.C. players
Walsall F.C. players
Norwich City F.C. players
Swindon Town F.C. players
Folkestone F.C. players
St Anthony's F.C. players
Scottish Football League players
Southern Football League players
1984 deaths
Scottish Junior Football Association players